The Rio Grande do Sul State University (UERGS) is a Brazilian public university.  It was founded in 2001 in the city of Porto Alegre and its campuses are distributed across several cities in the Rio Grande do Sul state.

References

Universities and colleges in Rio Grande do Sul
Educational institutions established in 2001
2001 establishments in Brazil
State universities in Brazil